Levelland Independent School District is a public school district based in Levelland, Texas (USA).

In addition to Levelland, the district also serves the town of Opdyke West.

Texas author Lou Halsell Rodenberger (1926–2009) taught English and journalism at Levelland High School in the late 1940s.

Popular football coach Gene Mayfield concluding his career at Levelland.

In 2009, the school district was rated "academically acceptable" by the Texas Education Agency.

Schools
Levelland High School
Levelland Middle School
Capitol Intermediate
South Elementary
ABC Early Childhood Center
Cactus Special Programs
Estrada School of Economics
McCoy Institute of Neurobiology
Whiteside School of Art
Carlton School of Cosmotology

References

External links
Levelland ISD

School districts in Hockley County, Texas